The 2013 SEABA Under-16 Championship was the qualifying tournament for Southeast Asia Basketball Association at the 2013 FIBA Asia Under-16 Championship. The tournament was held in Yogyakarta, Indonesia from July 14 to July 18.

Round robin

Final standings

Awards

References
 Schedule for 2013 2nd SEABA U16 Championship

2013
International basketball competitions hosted by Indonesia
2013–14 in Indonesian basketball